Centrolene lemniscata is a species of frog in the family Centrolenidae.
It is endemic to Peru.
Its natural habitats are subtropical or tropical moist montane forests and rivers.
Its status is insufficiently known.

Sources

lemniscata
Amphibians of Peru
Taxonomy articles created by Polbot
Amphibians described in 1993
Taxobox binomials not recognized by IUCN